Freehold is a hamlet in the town of Greenville in Greene County, New York, United States. It has the ZIP Code 12431, and its own fire district.

The hamlet is centered on the junction of New York State Route 32 and Greene County Route 67. There are several buildings there, such as the firehouse and a general store. It is located in The Northern Catskill Mountains of Greene County; the range's northern escarpment dominates the view south from Freehold.

Freehold Airport is located one mile west of the town and is a major hub for gliders.

Notable person
Esbon Blackmar, former US congressman

References

Hamlets in New York (state)
Hamlets in Greene County, New York
Greenville (town), New York